Clarence Augustus Barbour (April 21, 1867 – January 16, 1937) was an American Baptist clergyman and educator most notable for having served as the president of Brown University.

Biography

Early life
He was born on April 21, 1867, in Hartford, Connecticut. He graduated from Brown University in 1888.

Career
He served as the president of his alma mater, Brown University, from 1929 to 1936.  He also served as president of the Rochester Theological Seminary for thirteen years.  He was a member of the Laymen's Commission that produced "Re-Thinking Missions: A Laymen's Inquiry after One Hundred Years" (1932), which was a harsh critique of foreign missions.

His wife, Florence Newell Barbour, was a musician and composer.

Death
He died on January 16, 1937, in Providence, Rhode Island, at the age of 69, two weeks before his planned retirement from Brown.

Selected works

Hocking, William Ernest, Re-Thinking Missions: A Laymen's Inquiry after One Hundred Years (1932)  Harper & Brothers, New York City.

References

External links

1869 births
1937 deaths
American educational theorists
American school administrators
Baptist ministers from the United States
Brown University alumni
Religious leaders from Hartford, Connecticut
Presidents of Brown University
Colgate Rochester Crozer Divinity School faculty
Burials at North Burying Ground (Providence)